Spring Grove Area High School is one of two, public secondary schools within the Spring Grove Area School District. The School is located in Spring Grove, York County, Pennsylvania, United States.

Athletics
The School provides the following sports:

Boys
Baseball - AAAAA
Basketball- AAAAA
Cross Country - AAA
Football - AAAAA
Golf - AAA
Lacrosse - AA
Soccer - AAA
Swimming and Diving - AAA
Tennis - AAA
Track and Field - AAA
Volleyball - AA
Wrestling - AAA
Girls
Basketball - AAAAA
Cheer - AAAAAA
Cross Country - AAA
Field Hockey - AA
Golf - AAA
Lacrosse - AA
Soccer (Fall) - AAA
Softball - AAAAA
Swimming and Diving - AAA
Girls' Tennis - AAA
Track and Field - AAA
Volleyball - AAAA

According to PIAA directory, 2018-19

Notable alumni
Torren Ecker, State Representative (Adams-R) in the 193rd District
Hali Flickinger, Olympic Swimmer
Seth Grove, State Representative (York-R) in the 196th District
Eli Brooks Star at Michigan

References

External links

Public high schools in Pennsylvania
Schools in York County, Pennsylvania